Scientifica is a constituent company of Judges Scientific Plc and was founded in 1997. The company is a manufacturer and supplier of laboratory instruments that include micromanipulators,  imaging systems, complete microscopy rigs, mounting equipment for microscopes and related accessories for electrophysiology and two photon microscopy, used in laboratories worldwide including pharmaceutical companies, universities and medical research facilities.

History
The company was the creation of former managing director Mark Johnson and his partner David Rogerson who purchased a subsidiary of Burleigh Inc.

In 2003 the company moved from being a distributor to a manufacturer of its own products. Their products are sold worldwide, including Europe, The United States of America (USA), Brazil, India, China, Korea, Singapore, Japan and Russia. The largest market is the United States but around thirty countries have bought Scientifica instruments.

Philosophy
Johnson and Rogerson's motivation was to provide bespoke and well tested products to electrophysiology and imaging researchers. Electrophysiology is the study and measurement of the electrical properties of biological cells and tissues, and Scientifica's products are used extensively to broaden the understanding of the nervous and cardiac systems, particularly diseases that include: Alzheimers, Parkinsons and Epilepsy.

Awards
 2014 Queen's Awards For Enterprise: Innovation for their Multiphoton Imaging System
 2013 Sussex Business Awards: International Business of the Year
 2013 Made In The South East Manufacturer Of The Year (under 25 million turnover)
 2012 Queens Award For Enterprise:  International Trade

Products 
 Micromanipulators
 Complete microscopy rigs
 Multiphoton Imaging including resonant and galvo scanning
 Laser Applied Stimulating and Uncaging
 Mounting equipment and Imaging Platforms.

Further reading 
Scientifica:  Experts in Electrophysiology & Imaging: Product range overview

References

External links 
 Scientifica

Companies based in Sussex
Companies established in 1997
Engineering companies of the United Kingdom
Technology companies of the United Kingdom
Laboratory equipment manufacturers